Koroğlu is a Baku Metro station. It was opened on 6 November 1972. It was called Məşədi Əzizbəyov until 30 December 2011.

See also
List of Baku metro stations

References

Baku Metro stations
Railway stations opened in 1972
1972 establishments in Azerbaijan